Akbulaksky District, also known as Ak-Bulaksky District, is an administrative and municipal district (raion), one of the thirty-five in Orenburg Oblast, Russia. Its administrative center is the rural locality (a settlement) of Akbulak. Population: 25,606 (2010 Census);  The population of Akbulak accounts for 54.4% of the total district's population.

Sagarchin border checkpoint located in this district.

History
Between 1921 and 1932, the district was a part of the Kirghiz Autonomous Socialist Soviet Republic (known as the Kazak ASSR since 1925). In February 1932, it became a part of Aktyubinsk Oblast and in the mid-1930s it was transferred to Chkalov Oblast (now Orenburg Oblast).

References

Notes

Sources



Districts of Orenburg Oblast